Covenant is the fifteenth album by the British hard rock band UFO. It was published as a limited edition 2-disc album, with disc 1, titled Covenant, containing entirely new material, and disc 2, titled Live USA, containing a collection of classics performed live. Covenant saw the return of Michael Schenker on guitar, as he had left the band in the middle of the Walk on Water tour.

Track listing

On CD 2, the following incorrect order of tracks is printed on the cover and on the disc itself:

Personnel

Band members
 Phil Mogg – vocals
 Michael Schenker – guitar
 Pete Way – bass
 Aynsley Dunbar – drums
 Simon Wright – drums (on Live USA)
 Paul Raymond – guitar, keyboards (on Live USA)

Additional musicians
Jesse Bradman, Luis Maldonaldo – backing vocals
Kevin Carlson – keyboards

Production
Mike Varney – producer
Ralph Patlan – associate producer, engineer, mixing, mastering 
Joe Marquez – engineer, mixing
Luis Maldonado – engineer, backing vocals
Gene Cornelius – assistant engineer
Tim Gennert – mastering
Steve Jennings – photography

Charts

References

2000 albums
UFO (band) albums
Albums produced by Mike Varney
Shrapnel Records albums